is a Japanese Nippon Professional Baseball player. He is currently with the Tohoku Rakuten Golden Eagles in Japan's Pacific League.

External links

Living people
1984 births
Baseball people from Tokyo
Japanese baseball players
Nippon Professional Baseball pitchers
Yomiuri Giants players
Tohoku Rakuten Golden Eagles players